Parliamentary elections were held in Guam in 1952.

Electoral system
The 21 members of the Legislature were elected from a single district, with the candidates receiving the most votes being elected. Candidates were required to be at least 25 years old and have lived in Guam for at least five years before the election.

Results
The Popular Party won a majority of seats, with the remainder won by independents.

Aftermath
Antonio Borja Won Pat was re-elected as Speaker.

References

1952 in Guam
Legislative elections in Guam
Guam